The Burns Realty Company–Karl Bickel House was a historic home in Sarasota, Florida. It was located at 101 North Tamiami Trail. On March 5, 1987, it was added to the U.S. National Register of Historic Places. The building was razed in 2000 to make room for the Sarasota Ritz-Carlton.

References

External links
 Sarasota County listings at National Register of Historic Places
 Sarasota County listings at Florida's Office of Cultural and Historical Programs

Houses on the National Register of Historic Places in Sarasota County, Florida
Houses in Sarasota, Florida
Mediterranean Revival architecture in Florida
Buildings and structures demolished in 2000
2000 disestablishments in Florida
Demolished buildings and structures in Florida